Mohammed Mooge Liibaan (1945-1984) was a prominent Somali instrumentalist, vocalist, poet, politician and activist.

History
Mooge was born in Hargeisa, British Somaliland and hails from the Eidagale subdivision of Garhajis of the larger Isaaq Somali clan. Him and his brother Ahmed Mooge Liibaan starting singing and composing Somali literature at a young age. Him and his brother were members of the Waaberi musical ensemble which was single handedly the most popular music group at the time but before starting his music career he worked as a school teacher.  Mooge is regarded by many Somalis to be one of the greatest Somali musicians to have ever lived. He was very popular especially for his abilities on the oud, an instrument he would come to be associated with.

Music
Popular songs by Mooge include:

Aamiinta kula idhi
Allahayow nin daacad ah
Adduunyoow
Adigiyo jacaylkana
Baxsanow Hadraawow
Ciilka Dadweynaha
Dadka hayska weyneyn
Dalxiis
Dhayyal looma heesee
Dhulkii hooyo
Doonidii Jacaylka
Galbis
Guga
Habluhu kala wanaagsan
Hami Iyo Jacayl
Haween U Samir
Idil
Ifka
Jirab
La Jiifiyaana
Maxaa Iga Galay Nin Geel Badan
Maxamed
Mudantii haweenkaa
Nabsiga Hiisha
Nafta Ku Ogolaatay
Oogada Jirkeygiyo
Saxarla
Saylaha
Shacbaan
Waa Oday Kasheekee
Walaac
Waayeel Dadow
Xeebtaa Jabuuti
Xilo Jano
Sabab Kale Ha Moodine

See also
Ahmed Mooge Liibaan
Abdikarim Ahmed Mooge
Waaberi
Music of Somalia
Abdullahi Qarshe
Ali Feiruz
Maryam Mursal
Mohamed Sulayman Tubeec

References
SomaliLyrics.net accessed October 8 2007
Heesaaga Somalia, accessed October 8, 2007
Somali Classic Songs accessed October 8 2007
Somali Democracy Watch Organization accessed October 8 2007 (translation necessary)

External links
 
Biography at fansite (link broken archived version)
Mohamed Mooge Songs

20th-century Somalian male singers
1984 deaths
1945 births
Oud players
People from Hargeisa